Jean Levy, known as Jean Ferry (16 June 1906 – 5 September 1974), was a French writer and screenwriter and follower of the 'pataphysical tradition'. He died in Val-de-Marne, France in 1974. He was described by Raphaël Sorin as "...a little man, round all over. A sharp eye behind round glasses, close-shaven head, high-pitched voice, and a potbelly that recalled Ubu's gidouille."

In addition to his literary career, he was known as an Oulipo guest of honour, satrap of the College of Pataphysics, and specialist in the cult figure and French poet, novelist and playwright, Raymond Roussel (also known as the eccentric neighbour of Proust).

Selected filmography
 Musicians of the Sky (1940) - directed by Georges Lacombe
 Children of Paradise (1944) - treatment written in hiding of the Marcel Carné / Jacques Prévert film
 The Eleventh Hour Guest (1945)
 Quai des Orfèvres (1947) - directed by Henri-Georges Clouzot
 Eternal Conflict (1948)
 Manon (1949) - directed by Henri-Georges Clouzot
 Miquette et sa mère (1949) - directed by Henri-Georges Clouzot
 Tuesday's Guest (1950) - directed by Jacques Deval
 The Beautiful Image (1951) - directed by Claude Heymann
 Spartacus (1951) - directed by Riccardo Freda
 Nana (1955) - directed by Christian-Jaque
 Cela s'appelle l'aurore (1955) - directed by Luis Buñuel
 Nathalie (1957) - directed by Christian-Jacque
 Tabarin (1958) - directed by Richard Pottier
 Babette s'en va-t-en guerre (1959) - directed by Christian-Jaque
 The Fenouillard Family (1960) - directed by Yves Robert
 Madame Sans-Gêne (1961) - directed by Christian-Jaque
 Vie privée (1962) - directed by Louis Malle
 Le Gentleman de Cocody (1965) - directed by Christian-Jaque
 La Faute de l'abbé Mouret (1970) - directed by Georges Franju
 Daughters of Darkness (1971) - directed by Harry Kümel
 Malpertuis (1972) - directed by Harry Kümel
 De Komst van Joachim Stiller - The Coming of Joachim Stiller (1974) - directed by Harry Kümel

See also 
 La Loi des rues (1956)
 Le Saint prend l'affût (1966)

References 

French male screenwriters
20th-century French screenwriters
1906 births
1974 deaths
20th-century French male writers